Anang Desai (born 4 May 1953) is an Indian film and television actor. Desai has appeared in more than 80 television shows and is popularly known for his portrayal of the character Babuji in the television series Khichdi and its eponymous film. He is an alumnus of the National School of Drama, New Delhi and was a part of the institute's professional repertory, performing Hindi theatre extensively before starting his career in the television and film domains.

Film career

Anang Desai started his film career in 1982 with Gandhi, in which he played Indian politician J. B. Kripalani.

Filmography

Television shows
 Pratishodh as Raghunath Verma
1988: Bharat Ek Khoj as Rajan (in Episode 3 - The Arrival of the Vedic People)  Ram Mohan Roy (in Episode 41 - The Bengal Renaissance)
1990: Tenali Rama as King Krishnadevaraya
1991–92: Humrahi 
1994: Byomkesh Bakshi (Episode: Ret ka Daldal/Quicksand) as Himangshu Roy
1995–1996: Akbar Birbal as Birbal 
 1996:  Karm as Mr. Solanki
1997–1998: Chattaan as Kamal Chopra
1997: Bombay Blue as Dr. Johal
1997–1999: Tanha
 1998 Teacher
1998–1999: Tejaswini
1999: Basera: Special Appearance
 2001 Kudrat as Udaynarayan Seth
 2001-2003: Gharana
2002–04: Khichdi as Tulsidas Parekh
 2003 Vishwaas as Raghuvansh Pradhan
2004: Pyaar Ki Kashti Mein
 2004–2006:  Reth as Gyan Pandey
2005–06: India Calling as Mr. Kapoor
2005–06: Instant Khichdi as Tulsidas Parekh
 2006–2007: Woh Rehne Waali Mehlon Ki as Jamnadas (J.D.) Thapar
2006–2007: Kashmakash Zindagi Ki as Rajdev
2006–2007 Lucky as Acharya Joshi
2007–09: Teen Bahuraaniyaan as Dwarkadas
2007–09: Lucky as Acharya Joshi
2008–09: Jasuben Jayantilaal Joshi Ki Joint Family as Jayantilaal Joshi
2009: Star Vivaah: Guest appearance
2009: Ladies Special as Jassi's father
2010: Miley Jab Hum Tum as Shashi Bhushan
2010: Taarak Mehta Ka Ooltah Chashmah as Tulsidas Parekh (Special appearance)
2010: Mrs. & Mr. Sharma Allahabadwale as Sharma's boss
2011: Sanskaar Laxmi as Jugmohan Purohit
2011–12: Don't Worry Chachu as Popatlal Desai
2012: Yeh Zindagi Hai Gulshan
2012: Ek Kiran Roshni Ki as P.K. Khanna
2012–13: Alaxmi Ka Super Parivaar as Natwarlal Kapadia
2013:  (German) as Rajesh
2013: Pradhanmantri as Sheikh Abdullah
2013: Chhanchhan as Matilalbhai Borisagar
 2014: Main Naa Bhoolungi as Mahanto Jagannath
 2014: Chandrakant Chiplunkar Seedi Bambawala as Hasubhai Mehta
 2014: Badi Door Se Aaye Hai as Judge (Cameo)
 2015 Dilli Wali Thakur Gurls as Justice L.N Thakur
2015: Chalti  Ka  Naam  Gaadi...Let's Go as Anil Ahuja
2016: Chidiya Ghar as Markati's father and Gadha Prasad's Father in law
2016: Khidki as Father of Nandini Tripathi
2018: Khichdi Returns as Tulsidas Parekh
2020: Shubharambh as Fufaji- Raja's paternal uncle and a lawyer by profession
2021: Mere Sai as Gajanand Kaka
2021: Bhabiji Ghar Par Hain! As Danny Sharma: Anita's loving and rich father who is an NRI based on America and hates Vibhuti because of their love marriage and his unemployment

References

External links

Living people
Male actors in Hindi cinema
21st-century Indian male actors
Indian male film actors
1954 births
Male actors from Mumbai
Place of birth missing (living people)
Gujarati people